Jesse Suntele (born 18 September 1992) is a South African actor, model, rapper and television personality. He became popular by winning the second season of the BET reality competition series Top Actor Africa in 2016.

Early life and education
Jesse Suntele was born in Johannesburg, South Africa. He attended primary school at Fairsand Primary School before moving to Bloemfontein in grade 4. After matriculating from St. Joseph's Christian Brothers College, he moved back to Johannesburg to study Sound Engineering at the Academy of Sound Engineering.

Career

Television
In 2013, he auditioned for the SABC 1 reality competition U Can Do It and made it into the Top 10. In 2014, he got a starring role in the first-season finale of the SABC 1 documentary-drama Ngempela, which was his first credited television acting role.

In 2015, he got a guest starring role on SABC 1's Generations: The Legacy. In that same year, he got his first recurring role on the e.tv soapie Ashes to Ashes. The following year in 2016, he won the second season of Top Actor Africa on BET. In that same year, he debuted on the Mzansi Magic telenovela The Queen, making his first appearance in the first season as Tuelo ("Officer Bae"), a policeman by day and a serial killer by night.

In 2017, he was also one of the main hosts for entertainment and variety show BET A-List. He also joined the cast of the Vuzu Amp reality competition series The Hustle, where he was one of the Season 2 contestants, using the rapper stage name "J-Flo" and made it into the Top 6. In that same year, he was nominated in the Feather Awards, for Hunk of the Year.

In 2018, he joined the e.tv soapie Rhythm City in the role of Nqaba.

In 2022, Suntele was cast as Phila Bhengu in the South African Netflix drama series Savage Beauty.

Music
He has released music as J-Flo, his singles include High by the Beach and Outta Town. He has also been featured on Kelly Khumalo's single Jehova.

In May 2021, he released his debut EP, What Did You Expect.

Filmography

Television

Discography

EPs
 What Did You Expect (2021)

Singles

Awards and recognition

2018 Cosmo Sexiest Men Finalist
2018 Mzansi's Sexiest top 12

References

External links
 

Living people
1992 births
Male actors from Johannesburg
Musicians from Johannesburg
People from Gauteng
South African male models
South African male television actors
South African rappers